National Route 651 (N651) forms a part of the Philippine highway network. It is one of the national secondary roads with two non-contiguous sections, one which runs through the municipality of Carmona, Cavite in the Calabarzon region
, while the other road runs within the island of Catanduanes in the Bicol region.

Route description

Cavite

N651 runs through the section of Governor's Drive in the municipality of Carmona, Cavite, where the road is also known as Carmona Diversion Road as it bypasses the town proper. Upon reaching the Carmona Rotonda, the rest of the road going to the province of Laguna is merged by N65.

Catanduanes
In the Catanduanes province, N651 runs through the municipalities of Panganiban and Caramoran, where the entire signed road is known as Panganiban–Sabloyon Road. It connects with N650 (Catanduanes Circumferential Road) on both ends.

References

Roads in Cavite
Roads in Catanduanes